Caryospora is a genus of fungi in the family Zopfiaceae.

References

External links
Index Fungorum

Pleosporales
Taxa named by Giuseppe De Notaris